Parasia Assembly constituency is one of the 230 Legislative Assembly (Vidhan Sabha) constituencies of Madhya Pradesh state in central India.

It is part of Chhindwara District.

Demography 
As of 2011 Census  Parasia, the biggest division and tehsil of Chhindwara district in Madhya Pradesh, had a population of 37,876. Males constitute 51% of the population and females 49%. Dongar Parasia has an average literacy rate of 71%, higher than the national average of 59.5%: male literacy is 78% and female literacy is 64%. In Dongar Parasia, 12% of the population is under 6 years of age.

Members of Legislative Assembly

Election results

2013

See also
 Parasia

References

Assembly constituencies of Madhya Pradesh